Strange and Beautiful is the third studio album from progressive metal band Crimson Glory. Signed to Atlantic Records in 1991, this album was a marked stylistic departure from their previous albums' decidedly progressive metal sound to a more bluesy, hard rock sound. It was the first album without longtime members, guitarist Ben Jackson and drummer Dana Burnell and it was also the last to feature vocalist Midnight. Two songs were co-written with former Drexel University Associate Professor and entertainment attorney, Marcy Rauer Wagman, while the first single "The Chant" was written by outside songwriters M. McKinley & Marti Frederiksen. Midnight departed the band prior to the tour and was replaced by future Michael Schenker Group frontman, David Van Landing. It was the only album in their canon to feature drummer Ravi Jakhotia and the band went on hiatus following the supporting tour.

Track listing

Personnel
 Midnight – lead vocals, background vocals
 Jon Drenning – guitars, background vocals
 Jeff Lords – bass, background vocals
 Ravi Jakhotia – drums, percussion

Additional musicians 
 John Avarese – keyboards
 Annette Hardeman, Charlene & Paula Holloway – background vocals
 Ric Sandler – grand piano
 Daryl Burgee – percussion
 Ron Kerber – saxophone
 Babatunde Olatunji – intro vocal to "Promise Land"

Production
Jon Drenning - producer, mixing
Mitch Goldfarb – producer, engineer, mixing
Brook Hendricks – second engineer
Brian Stover, John Fairhead, Jeff Chestek, Cherri Parker – assistant engineers
George Marino – mastering at Sterling Sound, New York
Justice Mitchell – artwork

References

External links
 

Crimson Glory albums
1991 albums
Atlantic Records albums
Roadrunner Records albums